Pinoy Mano-Mano: Celebrity Boxing Challenge was a Philippine sports reality program on ABS-CBN where celebrities participate in a boxing match. At the end of the season, the host Cesar Montano fought against another celebrity boxer in a special match.
Pinoy Mano Mano premiered on October 27, 2007, and aired on the ABS-CBN weekend block.

The participants included TJ Trinidad, Joem Bascon, Rico Robles, Rico Barrera, Jordan Hererra, Biboy Ramirez, Eric Fructuoso, and Michael Roy Jornales.

References

See also
List of programs broadcast by ABS-CBN

ABS-CBN original programming
Philippine reality television series
2007 Philippine television series debuts
2008 Philippine television series endings
Filipino-language television shows